Mamillariella geniculata is a species of moss in the family Leskeaceae. It is endemic to Russia, where it is an endangered species known from only five to seven locations in the Russian Far East. It grows in deciduous forest habitat which is threatened by development.

References

Hypnales
Endemic flora of Russia
Endangered plants
Taxonomy articles created by Polbot